Dolores Caballero Abril (9 May 1935 – 25 October 2020) was a Spanish singer and actress.

Biography
Dolores Abril specialized in the genre of copla. She was romantically and professionally partnered with singer-songwriter Juanito Valderrama from 1954 until his death in 2004. Together they released numerous albums, most notably Peleas en broma, and toured Spain with various shows such as Voces de España (1962), Mano a mano (1963), Su Majestad la alegría (1967), and Revolera en el Price (1968).

Among her solo discography, the singles "Al primer derrote" (1959), "Tú te casate" (1961), "Gloria a Chicuelo II" (1962), "Miguel de la Cruz Romero" (1963), and "Qué bonita está la Reina" (1963) stand out.

In 2009 she was awarded the "Claveles de la Prensa" prize by the Press Association of Seville.

She was the mother of singers  and Juana Dolores Valderrama.

On 25 October 2020 after living secluded for many years, Abril died in Seville at the age of 81.

References

External links
 
 

1935 births
2020 deaths
20th-century Spanish actresses
20th-century Spanish singers
Actresses from Andalusia
Singers from Andalusia
People from Hellín
Spanish film actresses
20th-century Spanish women singers